Śląkfa is the oldest of Polish science fiction and fantasy award, although less known than the Janusz A. Zajdel Award. It is awarded by the Silesian Fantasy Club, the oldest of still-active Polish fandom organizations. The award was first presented in 1983. It is awarded in three categories: Creator of the Year, Publisher of the Year and Fan of the Year.

Winners

References

External links 
 List of winners, Śląski Klub Fantastyki (polish)

Silesian culture
Polish science fiction awards
Awards established in 1983